Megan Lai (born 5 December 1979) is a Taiwanese actress and singer who is best known for Bromance, Miss Rose, Meteor Garden II  and Mars.

Life and career

Early life and education 
Lai was born on 5 December 1979 in Yonghe, Taipei County. She is the younger of two daughters. Her father operates a Chinese medicinal herb shop, and her older sister is a teacher.

Lai is left-handed, and is able to produce handwritten mirror text, in addition to normal writing with her right hand. As a result, she often has difficulty distinguishing left from right.

Lai graduated from Taipei Municipal Datong High School, where she was the President of her school's pop dance club. Lai completed her bachelor's degree in Information Communications at Shih Hsin University. In 2008, she enrolled as a part-time learner in Ming Chuan University. She graduated in 2011 with a Master of Arts in Design management.

Lai is also licensed barista, having attained her barista certificate in 2016.

Career

Career beginnings 
In 1999, Lai made her first television appearance on the Taiwanese variety show Guess in the segment "Do not judge a book by its cover", where she was a contestant along with Hebe Tien of girl group S.H.E, amongst others. She was later scouted by a modelling agency, where she started her career modelling for magazine pictorials, television advertisements, music video productions and fashion shows.

In 2002, Lai was scouted by notable television producer Angie Chai after appearing in Vic Chou's music video.

In December 2004, Lai released her first studio album, Love, which featured soundtracks from the television series' Mars and Starry Night, in which Lai also starred in.

Transition into leading roles 
In 2010, Lai appeared alongside Baron Chen, Lego Lee and Chie Tanaka in the drama Because of You.

Upon graduating with a Master of Arts in January 2011, Lai was cast in the police crime drama Next Heroes. Filming began in the same month, and only commenced its broadcast run in October of the same year. Concurrently in 2011, Lai played the role of Su Hai-er in the period drama The Invaluable Treasure 1949. The role earned her a Best Actress nomination at the 46th Golden Bell Awards.

In 2012, Lai was cast in the SETTV romantic comedy Miss Rose in which she played the titular character opposite Roy Chiu.

Rising popularity 
In 2014, Lai was cast in the role of A Bu-si, a lesbian barista in the highly anticipated movie adaptation of Café. Waiting. Love, penned by well-known Taiwanese novelist Giddens Ko. Lai started taking barista lessons and shed her long hair in preparation for the role, even going to the extent of not attending any public event to maintain the secrecy of her participation in the movie before her casting was announced to the public.

Lai was also cast as an ultramarathon coach in Jay Chou's first movie as an executive producer, 10,000 Miles, starring opposite Sean Huang and Darren Wang. To prepare for the role of an ultramarathon coach, Lai underwent training for three months under ultramarathon runner and executive producer, Kevin Lin. The movie was released in December 2016 to poor critical reception.

In September 2015, Lai received her fourth nomination for the Golden Bell Award for Best Actress in a Miniseries or Television Film for her role in the film The End of Love. The same month, Lai commenced filming for the romantic comedy Bromance, in which she played the role Pi Ya-nuo, a girl who has to pretend to be a boy until her 26th birthday to be safeguarded a smooth-sailing life. The drama ended its broadcast run to massive domestic and international success, and Lai received tremendous support for her portrayal in the drama.

In 2016, Lai joined the cast of the musical More Than Words, which celebrated the life and works of musical artist Chang Yu-sheng.

In 2018, after a short hiatus from acting, Lai returned to the small screen in the television series Meet Me @ 1006 in a guest appearance. Lai was then cast alongside Sammi Cheng, Kenny Bee and Richie Jen in the movie Fagara, the silver screen adaptation of Amy Cheung's novel Wo De Ai Ru Ci Ma La. The role earned her a Best Actress nomination for the Hong Kong Film Critics Society Award.

Lai also starred in the blockchain corporate warfare movie The Last Thieves opposite Yen Tsao, Joanne Tseng, and Eric Tsang, which was released in fall 2019.

Filmography

Television

Film

Variety show

Music video

Discography

Studio albums

Soundtrack appearances

Songwriting credits

Theater

Published works
 
  (e-book)

Awards and nominations

References

External links

 
 
 Megan Lai at Sina Weibo
 Megan Lai's Official Youtube Music Channel

1979 births
Taiwanese female models
Taiwanese television actresses
Taiwanese film actresses
Taiwanese stage actresses
Living people
21st-century Taiwanese singers
21st-century Taiwanese actresses
Actresses from New Taipei
Shih Hsin University alumni
Ming Chuan University alumni
21st-century Taiwanese women singers
Musicians from New Taipei